Puso ng Pasko is a 1998 Filipino comedy-drama fantasy film directed by Peque Gallaga and Lore Reyes and written by Peque Gallaga, Lore Reyes, and Paul Daza for Star Cinema. The film was an official entry of the 1998 Metro Manila Film Festival.

Plot
The story revolves around the Carpio family. The mother Ophelia (Cherry Pie Picache) loves to plant flowers especially roses. Her husband Miguel (Edu Manzano) is a well-respected man in their community. They use to celebrate Christmas with their children Dondi (Jason Salcedo), the eldest, Vincent (Justin Simoy) a paralytic, and their only daughter Maya (Korinne Lirio). But, when Ophelia gave birth to Christopher (Emman Abeleda) on Christmas Day, she got sick and series of events happened especially when Miguel's sisters Belle (Jaclyn Jose) and Christy (Rita Avila) came to the picture. Miguel suffered many problems in his business and was forced to go on hiding and Ophelia died and blamed Christopher. During Christmas season Belle and Christy along with their confidante Leopold (Manny Castañeda) are planning to sell the house and forcing the Carpio children as well as Tiyo Balti (Jaime Fabregas) and Lola Angeles (Anita Linda) to leave. However, Dondi and his siblings were moved to the garage. However, Tiyo Balti was there to help them and said the Christmas is the season of miracles, especially Dondi's girlfriend Sandy (Anna Larrucea). Their only way to save their house is the land title that was now yet found. They also saw a Christmas ball that come to life and introduced herself as Merry (Jolina Magdangal). Merry were given each of them one wishes except for Vincent who does not believe in the spirit of Christmas. However, they are barred from saying or sharing their wishes or it will come true. Maya was the first to make a wish, while they are in the Church attending Simbang Gabi, she wished for Vincent to walk again. Vincent fell and was able to walk again. For Christopher, he wished to have snow in Philippines. Although it's a tropical country, it began to snow. However, series of disasters happened because of snow. Especially Christopher who suffered pneumonia. When Christopher saw Belle and Christy making a fake title, he was also saw by Christy and hid himself buried in snow. Now, he is dying, Dondi wished to Merry for Christopher to be healed. He was completely healed that the doctor could not believed what caused his complete recovery. But, Vincent knew that it was Dondi who wished for him to walked again, until he knew that it was Maya. Because of the doctor's advice that Christopher might got sick again because of the snow, Sandy wished for the snow to stop. Belle and Christy goes for drastic measures to forced the children to get out. However, they were given until Christmas Day to go out. On Christmas Eve, they celebrated Christmas as well as Christopher's birthday and Merry bid farewell to them. As they celebrated Christmas, Belle and Christy came to tell them to get out. But, when Angeles came, Maya gave her a piece of white rose. When Angeles asked where she get the rose, they brought her to the garden and Angeles started to dig. The demolition team came but Dondi stopped them from destroying the house until Angeles found a chest and remembered everything. She recalled that their mother Ophelia put the land title, and they found the real land title. An outraged Christy threw a piece of debris from the pergula and hit Dondi to the head. Dondi, already bleeding returned to the garage and he was helped by Christopher. But Christopher, saw Dondi taken by an angel, and Christopher wished once again to Merry. He wished for Dondi to return, in exchange, he gave to her his necklace with the pictures of his parents. Dondi returned and told Christopher that he is sleeping. An unexpected visitor came as the Carpio family is about to go to Church to attend the Christmas Eve Mass. The visitor turned out to be Miguel, their estranged father. Dondi, Vincent, Maya and Christopher had reunited with their father on Christmas day.

Cast and characters
Jason Salcedo as Dondi Carpio
Justin Simoy as Vincent Carpio
Korinne Lirio as Maya Carpio
Emman Abeleda as Christopher Carpio
Jaclyn Jose as Belle Carpio
Rita Avila as Christy Carpio
Jolina Magdangal as Merry
Edu Manzano as Miguel Carpio
Cherry Pie Picache as Ophelia Carpio
Anita Linda as Lola Angeles
Jaime Fabregas as Baltazar Tiyo Balti
Anna Larrucea as Sandy

Supporting cast
Lara Fabregas as Binibining Kulimlim
Ernie Zarate as the family doctor
Giselle Toengi as Manolita Morato
Ogie Diaz as the talk-show host
P.J. Oreta as the newscaster
Junell Hernando as Jon-Jon
Anthony Rosaldo as young Dondi
Isaiah Samuel as young Vincent

Production
The majority of the visual effects of the film were handled by Roadrunner Network, Inc.

Soundtrack

Track listing 
Adapted from the Puso Ng Pasko (Original Soundtrack) liner notes.

Personnel 
Adapted from the Puso Ng Pasko (Original Soundtrack) liner notes.

 Arranger – Toto Gentica (tracks 1,2,4,6,9)
 Guitars – Lou Bonnevie (tracks 1,6,9)
 Guitars – Arnel Sevilla (track 7)
 Back-up Vocals – Dimitri Productions' Artists-In-Residence (track 1)
 Recording engineers – Arnel Candelario (track 2)
 Recording engineers – Whannie Dellosa & German Mendoza Jr. (tracks 3,5,7,8)
 Project Assistants from Dimitri Productions – Myla Clarion and Camilo Ocenada
 Recorded and Mastered at – Dimitri, Studios, 1998 (tracks 1,2,4,6,9)
 Recorded and Mastered at – Audio Post (tracks 3,5,7,8)
 Buddy Medina – executive producer
 Rene A. Salta – a&r supervision

References

External links
 

Philippine comedy-drama films
Philippine Christmas films
Star Cinema films
Filipino-language films
1998 films
Films directed by Peque Gallaga
Films directed by Lore Reyes